Camarenilla is a municipality located in the province of Toledo, Castile-La Mancha, Spain. At the time of 2006 census (INE), the municipality had a population of 563 inhabitants.

References

Municipalities in the Province of Toledo